Dharmnarayan Joshi  is an Indian politician from the Bharatiya Janata Party and a member of the Rajasthan Legislative Assembly representing the Mavli Vidhan Sabha constituency of Rajasthan.

References 

1955 births
Members of the Rajasthan Legislative Assembly
Living people